Gustave Poppe (born 21 August 1924) was a Belgian basketball player. He competed in the men's tournament at the 1948 Summer Olympics.

References

External links
 

1924 births
Possibly living people
Belgian men's basketball players
Olympic basketball players of Belgium
Basketball players at the 1948 Summer Olympics
People from Etterbeek
Sportspeople from Brussels